Basketball contests at the 1972 Summer Olympics was the eighth appearance of the sport of basketball as an official Olympic medal event. It took place at Rudi-Sedlmayer-Halle in Munich, Germany from August 27 to September 9. The Soviet Union controversially won the gold medal game against the United States. This was the first time that the USA did not win a gold medal since the sport's introduction into the Olympics at the 1936 Berlin Summer Olympics. The bronze was won by Cuba, the only Olympic medal they have won in basketball. Another controversy was suspension of Mickey Coll after a positive drug test.

Medal summary

Qualification
Automatic qualifications were granted to the host country and the first four places at the previous tournament. Additional spots were decided by various continental tournaments held by FIBA plus an additional pre-Olympic tournament that granted two extra berths.

 Egypt withdrew from the tournament following the events of the Munich massacre.

Format
 Two groups of eight teams are formed, where the top two from each group compete for the medals in a knockout round.
 The remaining places are defined as follows:
Fifth through eighth places are decided in a separate bracket between the third and fourth places from each group in a separate bracket.
Ninth through sixteenth places are decided between the fifth through eighth places from each group in separate brackets.

Tie-breaking criteria:
 Head to head results
 Goal average (not the goal difference) between the tied teams

Squads
For the team rosters see: Basketball at the 1972 Summer Olympics – Men's team rosters.

Preliminary round
The top two teams from each group advance to the semifinals, while the remaining teams compete for 5th through 16th places in separate brackets.

Group A

Group B

Knockout stage

Medal bracket

Classification brackets
5th–8th place

9th–12th place

13th–16th place

 Forfeited match.

Final

Awards

Final standings

References
 
 FIBA Results Archive:

Citations

External links
 ESPN Classic account of the gold medal game

 
basketball
1972
1972 in basketball
International basketball competitions hosted by West Germany